Filip Aleksandrov Videnov (born June 12, 1980) is a Bulgarian retired professional basketball player who last played for Beroe of the NBL. He was also a longtime member of the Bulgarian men's national team.

Videnov played college basketball in the United States at Western Kentucky University.  He played high school basketball at Washington College Academy in Limestone, Tennessee.

See also 
 List of foreign basketball players in Serbia

References

External links
 Filip Videnov at bgbasket.com
 Filip Videnov at tblstat.net
 Filip Videnov at acb.com
 Filip Videnov at legabasket.it
 Filip Videnov at euroleague.net
 Filip Videnov at eurobasket.com
 Filip Videnov at fiba.com

1980 births
Living people
ABA League players
Asseco Gdynia players
Basketball League of Serbia players
BC Beroe players
BC Krasnye Krylia players
BC Levski Sofia players
BC Nizhny Novgorod players
Bulgarian expatriate basketball people in France
Bulgarian expatriate basketball people in Italy
Bulgarian expatriate basketball people in Poland
Bulgarian expatriate basketball people in Serbia
Bulgarian expatriate basketball people in Spain
Bulgarian expatriate basketball people in Turkey
Bulgarian expatriate basketball people in the United States
Bulgarian men's basketball players
CB Granada players
Eskişehir Basket players
Bulgarian expatriate basketball people in Croatia
KK Crvena zvezda players
KK FMP (1991–2011) players
KK Split players
Nuova AMG Sebastiani Basket Rieti players
PBC Academic players
Petrochimi Bandar Imam BC players
Real Betis Baloncesto players
Real Madrid Baloncesto players
Shooting guards
SLUC Nancy Basket players
Basketball players from Sofia
Western Kentucky Hilltoppers basketball players